Kukunoor is a village in Eluru District of the Indian state of Andhra Pradesh. It was in Khammam district, until the formation of Telangana state in 2 June 2014.

Geography
It has an average elevation of 29 metres (98 ft).

Demographics 
 Census of India, Kukunoor had a population of 6380. The total population constitute, 3176 males and 3204 females with a sex ratio of 1009 females per 1000 males. 539 children are in the age group of 0–6 years, with sex ratio of 918. The average literacy rate stands at 64.42%.

Transport
Bhadrachalam to Rajahmundry buses stops here daily. Nearest airport is Rajahmundry Airport.

References

Villages in Eluru district
Mandals in Eluru district